Ferdinanda Martini-Pautasso (27 August 1923 – 21 January 1993) was a Swiss diver. She competed in the women's 10 metre platform event at the 1952 Summer Olympics.

References

External links
 

1923 births
1993 deaths
Swiss female divers
Olympic divers of Switzerland
Divers at the 1952 Summer Olympics
Place of birth missing